Mr. D is a Canadian television series starring comedian Gerry Dee. The series follows the misadventures of an underqualified schoolteacher named Gerry Duncan, nicknamed Mr. D. It debuted on CBC on January 9, 2012 and concluded after eight seasons on December 19, 2018.

On December 11, 2020, Mr. D became available for streaming in the United States on Amazon Prime Video.

Cast
 Gerry Dee as Gerry Duncan: an under-qualified high school social studies teacher who prefers to be called Mr. D by the children and is jealous when the school's actual Mr. D (Paul Dwyer) returns to Xavier Academy. During Season 8, he is promoted to the role of principal of Xavier Academy.
 Jonathan Torrens as Robert Cheeley: Robert is the vice principal of the school but his bizarre character traits make it difficult for his colleagues to respect him. He becomes co-principal with Lisa in season 6 and sole principal at the end of season 6.  In Season 8, he is co-vice-principal with Mr. Dwyer.
 Lauren Hammersley as Lisa Mason: a competent and responsible former teacher and principal, known for her traditional teaching style. She has a Masters in Education and a PhD in Medieval literature. In the seventh season, she is the school guidance counselor. 
 Bette MacDonald as Trudy Walsh: the school secretary who runs much of the day-to-day business at Xavier Academy.
 Naomi Snieckus as Bobbi Galka: the confident and respected PE teacher at Xavier Academy.
 Darrin Rose as Bill Cogill: Gerry's roommate and a womanizing bachelor who works as the local bartender, until the bar closes in the final season.  He then runs a smoothie bar at Xavier Academy.
 Mark Little as Simon Hunt: the science teacher of the school, he is weak and a typical science geek who is also assistant coach of the girls' basketball team.
 Wes Williams as Paul Dwyer: Paul is cool and loved by all the teachers, and was the original Mr. D to the children before he left. During the final season, he is the co-vice-principal of Xavier Academy with Robert Cheeley.  Gerry is often jealous of Dwyer and feels that he is in competition with him.
 Suresh John as Malik: the mysterious school custodian with an unusual history.
 Kathleen Phillips as Emma Terdie: Emma is the librarian who runs a tight ship and demands that rules are followed and that things are always done by the book in her library.
 Bill Wood as Frank: the school's guidance counselor and assistant basketball coach to Mr. D. He uses crutches to walk.
 Emma Hunter as Nisha Corcoran, who is hired in Season 5 to replace Mr. D when he's fired by Ms. Mason.  She has a relationship with Mr. Hunt.

Main characters

Production
Creator, writer, executive producer and star Gerry Dee based Mr. D on his ten years teaching physical education in high school before he left for a career in stand-up comedy in 2003. The pilot episode was directed by Steve Wright and produced by Gerry Dee and Michael Volpe. The show is filmed on location at Citadel High School in Halifax, Nova Scotia.

Mr. D was renewed for a third season on April 3, 2013, and for a fourth season on April 4, 2014.

For the fourth season, CBC included the series in a production deal with City. Under the deal, Mr. D and City's new sitcom Young Drunk Punk will each air on their own originating network in the winter of the 2014–15 television season, then swap networks for a second run in the fall of the 2015–16 season.

CBC announced that Mr. D had been renewed for a fifth season in a press release dated March 4, 2015.

16 February 2016, CBC announced "Mr. D" had been renewed for a sixth season in a press release.

On April 6, 2017 Dee confirmed the show had been renewed for a seventh season.

On March 11, 2018 the show was renewed for an eighth season. Dee confirmed this would be the show's last.

Episodes

Series overview

Season 1 (2012)

Season 2 (2013)

Season 3 (2014)

Season 4 (2015)

Season 5 (2016)

Season 6 (2016)

Season 7 (2017)

Season 8 (2018)

Reception
The first episode of the show was watched by 1.23 million viewers, which was the biggest midseason debut for the CBC 2011–12 season.

Awards and nominations

Proposed U.S. version

On October 31, 2015, Gerry Dee and Mr. D co-creator Michael Volpe announced an agreement had been signed with Will Arnett's newly formed TV production company, Electric Avenue, to develop an American version of the show for American network CBS.

Dee revealed the initial contact with Will Arnett came from a friend of a friend who went to school with Arnett.  He stated that there had been small interest from American television in the past, but this was the first serious proposal to get an American version of the show up.

Dee and Volpe originally pitched the show as an American reboot with Dee reprising his role. However, CBS was looking to use the show as a vehicle for an American star with Dee and Volpe getting executive producer credits. Veteran comedic actor Tom Arnold had been signed to the title role. CBS also mentioned hiring Tom Hertz as showrunner. Hertz was previously executive producer of popular American sitcoms Spin City and King of Queens.

While Dee understands a show about his life as a teacher before he became a comedian will be adapted to suit American audiences, with changes including a multi-camera American sitcom system rather than the single camera Canadian system, he hopes the American version will retain Mr. D's mix of character humour, physical comedy and authenticity, along with its use of talented young actors for students instead of 25-year-olds playing teenagers.

References

External links
 
 

2010s Canadian high school television series
2010s Canadian sitcoms
2010s Canadian workplace comedy television series
2012 Canadian television series debuts
2018 Canadian television series endings
CBC Television original programming
Television series about educators
Television series by Entertainment One
Television shows filmed in Halifax, Nova Scotia
Citytv original programming